Joe Ochman is an American actor who is most active in voice over roles in various animation shows, films, and video games. He is the fourth and current voice of Jiminy Cricket since 2014.

Filmography

Live-action
 Adventures in Voice Acting – Himself
 Ally McBeal – Patron #1
 Best Friends Whenever - Ulrich
 Big Bad Beetleborgs – Hypnomaniac
 Buffy the Vampire Slayer – Janitor
 Desperate Housewives – Justice of the Peace
 Garfield: The Movie – Engineer #3
 House – Surgeon
 How High – Ben Franklin
 Judging Amy – Tanner
 Malcolm in the Middle – Announcer
 Married... with Children – Guy
 NYPD Blue – Al Fickman
 Saved by the Bell: The New Class – Repairman
 Saving Lincoln – Judge David Davis
 Seinfeld – Customer 
 Will & Grace – Chuck

Anime
 B-Daman Crossfire – Dragren
 Bleach – Hachigen "Hacchi" Ushoda, Ryu Kuzu, Shin'etsu Kisaragi, Shūsuke Amagai
 BNA: Brand New Animal - Prime Minister Shiramizu
 Bobobo-bo Bo-bobo – Softon
 Coppelion – Natsume
 Cowboy Bebop – Gordon's Henchman B
 Cyborg 009 – Cyborg 0010
 Digimon Adventure 02 – Crabmon/Coelamon
 Digimon Data Squad – Kevin Crier, Deputymon #1, Soldier #2, UlforceVeedramon
 Digimon Fusion – Dondokomon
 Digimon Tamers – Makuramon
 Dorohedoro - Jonson
 Duel Masters – Hakuoh (Season 1.5)
 Flint the Time Detective – Nascal, Uglinator
 Godzilla Singular Point — Makita K. Nakagawa
 Hunter x Hunter – Zeno Zoldyck
 JoJo's Bizarre Adventure – Will A. Zeppeli
 Mon Colle Knights – Prince Eccentro
 Naruto – Poccha
 Naruto Shippuden – Nekomata (Ep. 189), Tekuno Kanden (Ep. 190)
 Overman King Gainer – Manman Douton
 Stellvia – Richard James
 Tengen Toppa Gurren Lagann – Gabal Docker
 Transformers: Robots in Disguise – Hightower
 Wolf's Rain – Owl
 Zatch Bell! – Various
 Little Witch Academia -Paul Hanbridge

Animation
 Animalia – Wooster Q. Weasel
 Doc McStuffins – Mayor Billington
 Hubert and Takako – Hubert, Additional Voices
 The Idhun Chronicles – Mago Szish
 Miraculous: Tales of Ladybug & Cat Noir – André Bourgeois, Additional Voices
 The Wonderful World of Mickey Mouse – Jiminy Cricket

Audiobooks
 Skin in the Game by Nassim Nicholas Taleb

Films
 Bleach: Hell Verse – Taikon
 Chickenhare and the Hamster of Darkness – Abe
 Cowboy Bebop: The Movie – Climate Control Worker, Warehouse Patrolman 
 Ernest & Celestine – Rat Lawyer
 Godzilla: City on the Edge of Battle – Endurphe
 Godzilla: Planet of the Monsters — Endurphe
 Mobile Suit Gundam F91 – Roy Jung
 Patlabor: The Movie – Mikiyasu Shinshi
 Seal Team - Seal
 The Little Polar Bear – Caruso
 The House of Magic – Mr. Eames
 The Son of Bigfoot – Trapper the Raccoon, Tom
 The Swan Princess Christmas – Bromley, Butley
 The Swan Princess: A Royal Family Tale – Bromley
 Truth or Dare – Callux

Dubbing of foreign shows in English

Video games
 Call of Duty: Advanced Warfare – Additional Voices
 Command & Conquer 4: Tiberian Twilight – Additional Voices
 Diablo III – Additional Voices
 Diablo III: Reaper of Souls – Additional Voices
 Dishonored 2 – Guards
 Fallout 4 – Male Children of Atom, Vault Security
 Final Fantasy XV: Episode Ardyn – Additional Voices
 Fire Emblem Warriors: Three Hopes – Solon, Tomas
 Iron Chef America: Supreme Cuisine – Marty Bianco
 Kingdom Hearts HD 2.5 Remix – Jiminy Cricket (Re:Coded HD Cinematics)
 Kingdom Hearts III – Jiminy Cricket
 Lichdom: Battlemage – Additional Voices 
 Life Is Strange – William Price
 Life Is Strange: Before the Storm – William Price (bonus episode "Farewell")
 Mr. Payback: An Interactive Movie – Candy Man
 Murdered: Soul Suspect – Adam Grantham, Gus Harvey, Nathan Pope
 Red Dead Redemption – Professor Harold MacDougal, Government Clerk
 Red Dead Redemption: Undead Nightmare – Professor Harold MacDougal (uncredited)
 Relayer'''' – Yodaka
 The Evil Within – Additional Voices
 World of Final Fantasy – Thane of Saronia, Uncle Takka
 World of Warcraft: Battle for Azeroth – Harlan Sweete, Kiro, Renzik the Shiv
 World of Warcraft: Cataclysm'' – Zanzil, Various

References

External links

American theatre directors
Living people
American male voice actors
American male video game actors
Year of birth missing (living people)